Lake Samaccota (possibly from Aymara sama color, quta lake) is a lake in Peru located in the Arequipa Region, Caylloma Province, Tisco District, northeast of the mountain named Palca.

See also 
 Wiswillani

References 

Lakes of Peru
Lakes of Arequipa Region